Richard Louis Jensen (born 1943) is an American historian who specializes in the study of the 19th-century Latter Day Saint movement in Europe and of 19th-century European Latter Day Saint immigrants in the United States. Jensen received his Bachelor of Arts degree in history from Utah State University and a Master of Arts degree in history from Ohio State University in 1972. Among his writings are Mormons in Early Victorian Britain.  Jensen was a research historian with the Joseph Fielding Smith Institute for Church History during its entire existence. Jensen is currently one of the co-editors involved in the Joseph Smith Papers Project.

References

Joseph Smith papers bio

External links 
 
 

1943 births
Living people

21st-century American historians
21st-century American male writers
American Latter Day Saint writers
Brigham Young University staff
Historians of the Latter Day Saint movement
Latter Day Saints from Ohio
Latter Day Saints from Utah
Ohio State University alumni
Utah State University alumni
American male non-fiction writers